The Major General of the Defence Staff (acronym: M.G.A.) is a high ranking general officer of the French Armed Forces and the deputy to the Chief of the Defence Staff. As such, it is the second highest position in the armed forces. Major Generals are nominated by the Minister of the Armed Forces and appointed by the Commander-in-Chief, the President of the French Republic. The designation of Major General is not indicative of any rank but is rather a position, as the most recent office holders were all five stars generals (OF-9).

History 
The office was established on 28 April 1948, during the reorganization of the French higher hierarchy.

Duties 
The major general leads the Defence Staff and is assisted by three general officers: the Deputy Chief of Staff for Operations (OPS), the Deputy Chief of Staff for Planning (PLANS) and the Deputy Chief of Staff for Performance (PERF).

They replace the chief of staff when necessary. As a flag officer, they are the commanding officer of the Site of Balard, headquarters of the French Armed Forces and the Ministry of the Armed Forces.

Office holders

References

Notes 

Military of France
French military staff
French generals